The Canadian Society for the Study of Rhetoric (CSSR;  []) is a bilingual scholarly society based in Canada that is open to scholars involved in the teaching or researching of rhetoric. While the CSSR was founded as a Canadian version of the International Society for the History of Rhetoric, and while—as implied by its original name, the Canadian Seminar on the History of Rhetoric (CSHR)—it originally focused on the history of rhetoric, the CSSR now focuses on a range of rhetorical scholarship. Its membership typically includes scholars from North America and Europe (not just Canada) and its conferences typically include joint sessions with other societies as a "natural reflection of the interdisciplinary interests of [its] members."

The CSSR publishes an online refereed journal, Rhetor, and meets annually for an academic conference, usually as part of the annual Congress of Humanities and Social Sciences run by the Canadian Federation for the Humanities and Social Sciences.

Presidents

 1980–1981 Judith Rice Henderson
 1981 Raymond Stephanson
 1981–1984 Joseph Schmidt
 1985 Elaine Fantham
 1986–1988 Albert Halsall
 1988–1990 John Stephen Martin
 1990–1993 Albert Halsall
 1993–1995 David Goodwin
 1995–1997 Joanne S. Norman
 1997–1999 Kim Fedderson
 1999–2001 Philippa Spoel
 2001–2003 Jennifer McLennan
 2003–2005 Tracy Whalen
 2005–2007 Sylvain Rheault
 2007–2009 Shannon Purves-Smith
 2009–2011 Rebecca Carruthers Den Hoed
 2011–2013 Jeanie Wills
 2013–2015 Pierre Zoberman
 2015–2019 Tania Smith

See also
List of learned societies

References

External links
 
 International Society for the History of Rhetoric

History organizations based in Canada
Learned societies of Canada